The 1967 season in American soccer was often considered to be the first season in the second professional era of American soccer. It was the 54th season of FIFA-sanctioned soccer in the United States.

Changes from 1965–66 
 In response to high TV ratings for the 1966 FIFA World Cup domestically, National Football League (American football) owners opt to create the National Professional Soccer League, while others create the United Soccer Association. Drastically different from past soccer leagues in the United States, the NPSL and USA are played during the spring seasons.

Honors and achievements

National team

Men's

League tables

NPSL

USA

Eastern Division

Western Division

ASL

National Challenge Cup 

Source: TheCup.us

References 

 
1967